The College of Sciences at the University of Texas at San Antonio in San Antonio, Texas is a college in science and research education. The college hosts more than 5000 students enrolled in fifteen undergraduate and sixteen graduate programs. The seven departments employs 286 tenure and non-tenure track faculty members. Students are exposed to collaboration through programs with local external research institutions including UT Health Science Center, Southwest Research Institute and the Southwest Foundation for Biomedical Research.

Departments and Programs 
There are various degrees offered by 7 major programs at the College of Sciences.

 Minor can be earned in the field.
 Concentration is offered in the field.

Biology 
The Biology department conducts research in a wide variety of areas such as Cell and Molecular Biology, Microbiology and Immunology, Neurology, and Plant Biology. This includes two of the college's focus areas of neuroscience and infectious diseases. The largest department in number of faculty members and students, biology accounts for 25 percent of the colleges funding.

Chemistry 

The Chemistry department conducts active research programs under the major sub-disciplines of organic chemistry, biochemistry, inorganic chemistry, analytical chemistry, materials chemistry, and physical chemistry as well as through interdisciplinary collaborations. The search for a molecular-scale understanding of chemical reactions and properties of nature underlie the research programs of the departmental faculty.

Computer Science 
The Computer Science department is one of the departments at the University that does research in many areas including compilers, programming languages, software engineering, networking, bioinformatics, algorithms, artificial intelligence, cyber security, high-performance computing, computer vision, and distributed computing. The department has doubled in size and in funding over the last few years, and now has 24 faculty members, computer labs, and many computing facilities and wireless networks.

Environmental Sciences and Ecology 
The Environmental Sciences and Ecology Department offers both undergraduate and graduate students research opportunities in areas such as Aquatic Science, Conservation and Restoration Ecology, and Natural Resources and Wildlife Management.

Geological Sciences 
The Geological Sciences department has been at UTSA from the earliest days of the University's history. Its research facilities include bio-geochemistry, environmental microbiology, hydro-geology, isotope geochemistry, micro-paleontology, remote sensing, spatial analysis, and X-ray diffraction.

Mathematics 
The Mathematics department has research scholars in ordinary differential equations, partial differential equations, functional analysis, numerical analysis, algebra, statistics, analytic number theory, applied mathematics, and mathematics education.

Physics and Astronomy 
The Physics and Astronomy department completes research including in the focus area of nanotechnology.  The department provides students the chance to interact with scientists in experimental physics, theoretical physics, space physics, and astrophysics and to collaborate with scientists from the Space Science and Engineering Division at Southwest Research Institute.

Research
Of the $34 million expended on research for the fiscal year 2008 in the University of Texas at San Antonio, the College of Sciences received 71 percent.  Allowing students to participate in the growth of their fields through research enables them to succeed both in academia as well as in the applied sciences.

The  Biotechnology, Sciences, and Engineering Building is one of the largest research-related educational centers in Texas. The building includes 70 research and instructional laboratories that facilitate interdisciplinary research and collaboration between scientists and engineers.

Centers & Institutes
Center for Advanced Computing and Network Research
Center for Research and Training in the Sciences (CRTS)
UTSA Brain Health Consortium (BHC)
San Antonio Cellular Therapeutics Institute (SACTI)
Center for Innovative Drug Discovery (CIDD)
Center for Water Research , Sustainability and Policy (IWRSP)
NASA MIRO Center for Advanced Measurements in Extreme Environments (CAMEE)
Institute for Cyber Security (ICS)
Center for Infrastructure Assurance and Security (CIAS)
San Antonio Institute for Cellular and Molecular Primatology (SAICMP)
South Texas Center for Emerging Infectious Diseases (STCEID)
UTSA Neurosciences Institute
Consortium on Nuclear Security Technologies (CONNECT)
Kleberg Advanced Microscopy Center (KAMC)
The Institute of Regenerative Medicine

Student organizations
There are many science organizations on campus.  
Beta Beta Beta Biological Honor Society
Mu Alpha Tau Mathematics Honor Society
Upsilon Pi Epsilon National Computing Science Honor Society
Chemistry Club - American Chemical Society Student Affiliate Chapter
Graduate Society of Physics Students
Society of Physics Students 
Society of Undergraduate Neuroscience
Statistics Club
Macintosh Exchange Activity - for students interested in automotive engineering
Physical Therapy Society
Physician Assistant Society
Pre Nursing Society - for engineering honors students
Pre Dental Society
Pre-Medical Society
Pre-Pharmacy Student Organization
Society of Mexican-American Engineers and Scientists 
Alpha Epsilon Delta - Pre-medical Society

References

Sciences